The Erie Triangle is a roughly 300-square-mile (780-square-kilometre) tract of American land that was the subject of several competing colonial-era claims. It was eventually acquired by the U.S. federal government and sold to Pennsylvania so that the state would have access to a freshwater port on Lake Erie. The Erie Triangle land makes up a large portion of present-day Erie County, Pennsylvania.

Background

Most of northwestern Pennsylvania came under American control following the 1784 Treaty of Fort Stanwix with the Iroquois Confederacy. The following year, a boundary dispute between New York and Pennsylvania erupted. However, this left an unclaimed area, which came to be known as the Triangle Lands.

The Triangle Lands problematically fell under neither New York's nor Pennsylvania's charter, while both Connecticut and Massachusetts also spoke up with claims derived from their original colonial "sea to shining sea" grants.

Of these four competing claimants (Pennsylvania, New York, Connecticut, and Massachusetts), only Pennsylvania was landlocked, except for a very tiny strip of coastline 3.75 miles in length. The Six Nations of the Iroquois Confederacy released the land to Pennsylvania in January 1789 for payments of $2,000 from Pennsylvania and $1,200 from the federal government. The Seneca Nation separately settled land claims against Pennsylvania in February 1791 for the sum of $800. This was accomplished without the approval of the federal government and in violation of the Contract Clause of the United States Constitution which reserved the right to make treaties to the federal government. With this access to the Great Lakes, Pennsylvania was persuaded to accept the western boundary established by the Surveyor General of the Northwest Territory following passage of the Northwest Ordinance in 1787.

The Erie Triangle is often described as a "tab" or "chimney" attached to the Keystone State. The water off the coast of the Erie Triangle is known as the Graveyard of Lake Erie because of the large number of shipwrecks that occurred in the area's stormy waters in the 18th and 19th centuries. It was also the site of a preliminary battle between forces that participated in the Battle of Lake Erie during the War of 1812. The battle itself took place in the Lake Erie Islands, at the western end of the lake, off the coast of Ohio.

See also
 Twin Tiers
 Northern Tier
 Southern Tier
 New York–Pennsylvania border
 Pennamite–Yankee War

References

External links
Explore PA History

Further reading
 
 
 

Border irregularities of the United States
Former regions and territories of the United States
History of Pennsylvania
Geography of Erie County, Pennsylvania
Internal territorial disputes of the United States